Cicysium or Kikysion was the largest of the eight towns of Pisatis in ancient Elis. It is located near the Elean towns of Buprasium and Dymaea, and near Pheraea in Arcadia. Its site is unlocated.

References

Populated places in ancient Elis
Former populated places in Greece
Lost ancient cities and towns